Gomaa (and its variant Gumaa) is a surname and a masculine given name. People with the name include:

Surname
 Abdallah Gomaa (born 1996), Egyptian football player
 Abdallah Gomaa Awad (born 1993), Egyptian football player
 Ahmed Gomaa (born 1988), Egyptian football player
 Ali Gomaa (born 1952), Egyptian Islamic scholar and jurist
 Fahd Gomaa (born 1999), Egyptian football player
 Hossameldin Gomaa (born 1984), Egyptian volleyball player
 Mohamed Adel Gomaa (born 1993), Egyptian football player
 Numan Gumaa (1937–2014), Egyptian attorney and politician
 Saleh Gomaa (born 1993), Egyptian football player
 Sharawi Gomaa (1920–1988), Egyptian military officer and politician
 Wael Gomaa (born 1975), Egyptian football player

Given name
 Gomaa Frahat (1941–2021), Egyptian cartoonist
 Gumaa Al-Shawan (1937–2011), Egyptian spy
 Mirgaani Gomaa Rizgalla (born 1946), Sudanese boxer

Surnames of Egyptian origin
Arabic masculine given names